Katee Sackhoff (born April 8, 1980) is an American actress known for playing Lieutenant Kara "Starbuck" Thrace on the Sci Fi Channel's television program Battlestar Galactica (2004–2009), Niko Breckenridge on the Netflix series Another Life (2019–2021), Victoria "Vic" Moretti on the A&E / Netflix series Longmire and Bo-Katan Kryze on the Disney+ series The Mandalorian, and also for providing the voice for Kryze in Star Wars: The Clone Wars (2012–2020) and Star Wars Rebels (2017) and the voice of Bitch Pudding on Robot Chicken (2005–present). She was nominated for four Saturn Awards for her work on Battlestar Galactica and won the award for Best Supporting Actress on Television in 2005.

Sackhoff also starred in the short-lived TV series The Fearing Mind (2000–2001) and The Education of Max Bickford (2001–2002); had recurring roles in the TV series Bionic Woman (2007), Nip/Tuck (2009), and CSI: Crime Scene Investigation (2010–2011); and had a lead role in the eighth season of 24 as Dana Walsh (2010). She had recurring roles on The Flash as Blacksmith and appeared twice as herself on The Big Bang Theory.

She had lead roles in the films Halloween: Resurrection (2002), White Noise: The Light (2007), Batman: Year One (2011), The Haunting in Connecticut 2: Ghosts of Georgia (2013), Sexy Evil Genius (2013), Riddick (2013), Oculus (2013) and Don't Knock Twice (2016).

Early life
Sackhoff was born in Portland, Oregon, and grew up in St. Helens, Oregon. Her mother, Mary, was an English-as-second-language (ESL) program coordinator, and her father, Dennis, a land developer. She graduated from Sunset High School in Beaverton in 1998. She began swimming at an early age and by high school planned to pursue a career in the sport until her right knee was injured. This led her to begin practicing yoga — which she continues today — and to pursue an interest in acting.

Career

Sackhoff moved to Los Angeles when she was 17 years old. Her first acting role was in the Lifetime film Fifteen and Pregnant (starring Kirsten Dunst), which motivated her to move to Hollywood and pursue an acting career after she graduated from high school. Sackhoff's first recurring role was as Annie in MTV's Undressed; she next won a supporting role as Nell Bickford in The Education of Max Bickford. She made her motion picture debut in My First Mister, then appeared as Jenna "Jen" Danzig in Halloween: Resurrection.

Sackhoff's most widely known role is as Kara "Starbuck" Thrace in the miniseries and follow-up TV series Battlestar Galactica, for which she won a Saturn Award in 2006 for Best Actress on Television. Her persona led the writers to develop the character as more complex and volatile. Galactica's executive producer Ron Moore described Sackhoff as having "magnetism"; and producer David Eick said, "We saw this whole other side that was all because of Katee: vulnerability, insecurity, desperation. We started freeing ourselves up to explore the weakness of the character because we knew Katee could express those things without compromising the character's strength." Sackhoff said her performance was inspired by Linda Hamilton's portrayal of Sarah Connor in Terminator 2: Judgment Day:  "I think that was the one character that I kind of looked to as far as body image and strength. I think I looked to her character and said, 'OK, that's kind of what you need to embody.
Toward the end of the filming of Battlestar Galactica, Sackhoff began feeling physically weak. Soon after filming wrapped, she was diagnosed with thyroid cancer. After surgery to remove her thyroid, she required no radiation treatments and by February 2009 was in remission.

In 2007, Sackhoff was cast as the evil cyborg Sarah Corvus in the short-lived NBC series Bionic Woman. David Eick, the show's executive producer, said, "[Sackhoff is] a very special find. Those actors who can combine the qualities of strength and vulnerability—they usually call those people movie stars." Sackhoff plays the female lead in the action/sci-fi film The Last Sentinel and the supernatural thriller White Noise: The Light.

Sackhoff appears as the main character in the Lifetime Original Movie How I Married My High School Crush. She has made guest appearances in Cold Case, ER, Law & Order, and Robot Chicken. Sackhoff provided the voice of a female marine in the video game Halo 3 and is featured in the viral marketing campaign for Resistance 2. In 2011, she provided the voice for Black Cat 2099 in Spider-Man: Edge of Time. She voiced Sarah Essen in the DC Comics animated film, Batman: Year One. She appears in four episodes of the fifth season of the series Nip/Tuck playing a new doctor, Dr. Theodora Rowe. However, for the sixth season Sackhoff was replaced by Rose McGowan for the role due to scheduling conflicts. Sackhoff headlined NBC's Dick Wolf-produced cop drama Lost and Found as Tessa, "an offbeat female LAPD detective who, after butting heads with the higher-ups, is sent as a punishment to the basement to work on John Doe and Jane Doe cases." The pilot was filmed in January 2009. NBC decided not to pick up the series. In 2009, she appeared as herself in The Big Bang Theory episode "The Vengeance Formulation", being fantasized as Howard Wolowitz's dream girl. She appears again in season 4, in the same role. Sackhoff appeared as a series regular in the eighth season of the TV series 24, playing Dana Walsh, a CTU data analyst with a secret.

In February 2010, Sackhoff signed on to play the lead in an ABC crime drama pilot, Boston's Finest. ABC decided not to pick up the series.

She made a special appearance in the Futurama episode "Lrrreconcilable Ndndifferences". In the fall of 2010, Sackhoff joined the cast of CSI: Crime Scene Investigation as Detective Reed, a smart investigator who does not do well with sensitivity. In 2011, Sackhoff guest starred in an episode of Workaholics as a homeless drug addict named Rachel.

From 2012 to 2017, Sackhoff co-starred as the lead female role in Longmire, an A&E/Netflix television series based on the novels by Craig Johnson. Sackhoff played Sheriff's Deputy Vic Moretti.

From 2012, Sackhoff provided voice acting for the Lucasfilm Animation series Star Wars: The Clone Wars, in which she played Bo-Katan Kryze, member of the revolutionary Mandalorian Death Watch and Nite Owls. She reprised this role in the sequel to the series, Star Wars Rebels, and in the seventh season of the original series produced by Disney+ in 2020. Also in 2020, Sackhoff appeared as Bo-Katan Kryze in the Disney+ live action original series The Mandalorian.

Sackhoff played Dahl, a mercenary hired to track down Vin Diesel's intergalactic convict character in Riddick.

In August 2012, Sackhoff became the co-host of the Schmoes Know Movies podcast on the Toad Hop Network. One of her first shows was with guest Sean Astin.

Sackhoff announced in April 2015 a new TV series project, Rain, which she wrote and is executive-producing through her Fly Free Productions. She also had a role in the video game Call of Duty: Black Ops III, performing voice over and motion capture as Sarah Hall.  She portrayed Pink Ranger Kimberly in Power/Rangers, a short depicting a dystopian future in the Power Rangers universe.

In 2017, Sackhoff joined The CW series The Flash in the recurring role of villain Blacksmith for its fourth season, billed as a special guest star.

On April 26, 2018, it was announced that Sackhoff was cast in a main role on the Netflix science-fiction drama series, Another Life. It ran for two seasons from 2019 to 2021. Sackhoff announced its cancellation in February 2022.

Personal life
Sackhoff and her Battlestar Galactica co-star Tricia Helfer co-founded the Acting Outlaws, a motorcycle-riding charity with which they have worked to raise awareness and funds for causes including the Gulf Restoration Network, the Humane Society, and the Red Cross amfAR.

Sackhoff is an avid healthy eater. Her YouTube channel has many videos related to her physique and associated training and dietary approaches. She is not a vegetarian but depending on the role she is training for, including competing in the Hawaii Spartan Sprint Obstacle Race in 2019, will alter her diet accordingly.

In 2018, Sackhoff met actor Robin Gadsby in Vancouver, British Columbia. The couple married in early October 2021 and have a daughter together.

Filmography

Film

Television

Video games

Audio

Awards and nominations

References

External links

 
 
 
 Executive producer Ron Moore discusses thrilling 'Galactica' cliffhanger Pittsburgh Post-Gazette, March 26, 2007. Retrieved February 21, 2022.
 Katee Sackhoff interview at The Scifi World
 Katee Sackhoff interview with AOL Canada

Living people
20th-century American actresses
21st-century American actresses
Actresses from Portland, Oregon
American film actresses
American women podcasters
American podcasters
American television actresses
American video game actresses
American voice actresses
People from St. Helens, Oregon
Sunset High School (Beaverton, Oregon) alumni
1980 births